The Assomption River (in French Rivière l'Assomption, named after the Assumption of Mary) is the most important waterway in the Lanaudière region of Quebec, Canada. Its source is the Mont Tremblant massif. Seven significant rivers flow into the Assomption (de la Boule, Versailles, Noire, la Chaloupe, Ouareau, Saint-Esprit, and Achigan) before it flows into the Rivière des Prairies at Repentigny, Quebec.

About 150,000 people live in the drainage area of this river.

Geography
The L'Assomption River watershed overlaps two natural environments, the Laurentian Mountains and the St-Lawrence lowlands, which cover about a third of the watershed area. Its relief is a uniform plain with some hills—from —dominated by agricultural lands. The texture of the soil is rather fine and rests on an impermeable argillaceous (clay) base.

The Laurentian Mountains form part of the Canadian Shield. This escarpment has many waterfalls.

Hydrography
From north to south the average slope of the river decreases. The steeper slopes of the highlands create a fast current whereas the lowland flats produces a slower flow. Moreover, the river meanders a lot which is especially evident at the town of L'Assomption, almost completely surrounded by a large loop of the river.

Most of the lakes are in the Laurentian highlands.

Water quality

Urban and industrial pollution
The water quality of the L'Assomption River is seriously affected by the area's social-economic conditions. Since 1950, the situation has been complicated by the urbanization of the river banks, by diversified agriculture, and by industrialisation along the southern portion of the river. Although the source of pollution has changed since 1950, because of strict environmental laws and the use of water purification equipment, water pollution is still not fully curbed.

Over 150,000 people live in the river's watershed in 43 municipalities, of which the most important are Repentigny, Joliette, Le Gardeur, and L'Assomption. In addition, the northern portion of the river's watershed is a popular vacation area, swelling the population by about 45,000 people during the vacation season.

The majority of the municipalities take their drinking water from the river and provide it to more than 100,000 people. The drinking water supply to other residences and country cottages, distributed over approximately 90 percent of the watershed area, comes from water wells.

Agricultural pollution
Besides the urban and industrial pollution, agricultural pollution also contributes greatly to the environment's contamination.

Agriculture has a dominant position along the river: in 1995 there were 1,305 producers with  under cultivation and possessing 73,563 animals.

Agricultural pollution takes several forms: direct pollution (discharge of manure directly in the rivers) and diffused pollution (infiltration of fertilizer products in the groundwater). Diffused pollution is difficult to control because it has a multitude of sources throughout the whole region. Yet without a solution to this problem the water quality of the river will never have the desired quality.

Drainage basin watercourses

List of towns crossed

Saint-Côme, Quebec
Saint-Alphonse-Rodriguez, Quebec
Sainte-Béatrix, Quebec
Saint-Jean-de-Matha, Quebec
Sainte-Mélanie, Quebec
Saint-Félix-de-Valois, Quebec
Notre-Dame-des-Prairies, Quebec
Saint-Charles-Borromée, Quebec
Joliette, Quebec
Saint-Paul, Quebec
Saint-Gérard-Majella (merged with L'Assomption)
L'Assomption, Quebec
Repentigny, Quebec
Le Gardeur, Quebec (merged with Repentigny)
Charlemagne, Quebec

References

External links

Corporation de l'Aménagement de la Rivière l'Assomption
De l'Outaragasipi à la Rivière l'Assomption

Assomption